Jessica Dinnage (born 22 October 1993) is a Danish actress. She is best known for her role as Lea in Netflix's TV series The Rain. In 2019, Dinnage won a Robert Award for Best Actress in a Supporting Role at the Danish Film Academy Robert Awards for her performance as Iben in the 2018 film The Guilty.

Early life
Jessica Dinnage studied at the Danish National School of Performing Arts (Den Danske Scenekunstskole) in Copenhagen.

Career
Jessica Dinnage made her screen acting debut Charlotte Sieling's film The Man in 2017. This was followed in 2018 with a main role in Gustav Möller's 2018 film  The Guilty institutioner/den-dansk alongside Jakob Cedergren, about a police search for a kidnapped woman, which was selected as Denmark’s official entry for the Best Foreign Language Film at the academy awards. 
Later in 2018, she starred alongside Alba August and Lucas Lynggaard Tønnesen and Angela Bundalovic as Lea in the Netflix series The Rain, which tells the story of a group of people trying to survive six years after a deadly virus carried in the rain wiped out nearly all humans in Scandinavia.

In 2019, Dinnage won a Robert Award for Best Actress in a Supporting Role at the Danish Film Academy annual Robert Awards for her performance as Iben in the 2018 film The Guilty.

Filmography

Film

Television

Awards and nominations

References

External links
Jessica Dinnage at “Den Dansk Scenekunstskole (DDSKS)”

21st-century Danish actresses
Danish film actresses
Living people
Danish television actresses
1993 births